Venghai is a 2011 Indian Tamil-language action drama film written and directed by Hari and produced by B. Venkatarama Reddy. The film stars Dhanush and Tamannaah, while Rajkiran, Prakash Raj,  and Ganja Karuppu play supporting roles. The music was composed by Devi Sri Prasad with cinematography by Vetri and editing by V. T. Vijayan.

The story is based in Sivagangai district. The filming started in November 2010 in Trichy, and the film was released on 8 July 2011.

Plot
Veerapandi is a respected man in Pandiapuram, Sivagangai district who controls around 50% votes in his constituency. He is married to Thangam and has two children, Selvam and Selvi. Rajalingam is the corrupt incumbent local MLA from the ruling party, who was elected with backing from Veerapandi. Rajalingam pretends to be loyal only for Veerapandi's support. One day, the DC organizes a meeting to decide the location of a new railway station, where Rajalingam has already pre-fixed a town for bribe purpose, but Veerapandi thwarts Rajalingam's plan and convinces the meeting to set another small town as the location for the station. Rajalingam's men bomb a railway track to derail a train, but Selvam stops the train and catches the bombers.

Frustrated that Selvam screwed up the chance to catch the real perpetrator, Veerapandi sends Selvam to Trichy to stay with his uncle Mariyappan, a real estate agent, in order to protect him. In Trichy, Selvam meets his childhood friend Radhika and also makes Mariyappan return money to Radhika's uncle, who had bought land from Mariyappan, which then went to a civil struggle with the air force. Selvam also gets beaten up by a local thug Peter, due to an SMS joke by Radhika on Peter, who is filmed attacking Selvam by a professor, and he is imprisoned. Rajalingam tries to kill Selvam to weaken Veerapandi and uses Peter's local gang in Tirchy. Selvam saves a college professor from being assaulted by Peter's gang, and a fight ensures. Peter is beaten up and goes to bring Anburaj and his men.

Veerapandi learns of Selvam's issues and arrives at the college at the same time. Anbu understands that Selvam is Veerapandi's son, and begs for forgiveness. Veerapandi learns that Rajalingam is about to buy a huge plot of land with black money, and catches him red-handed after the registration in Trichy and thrashes him. Selvam arrives there accidentally, and the father-son duo makes Rajalingam donate the land to Sivagangai Corporation. Veerapandi also commands Rajalingam to resign within a week or he will be killed, with both events causing a by-election. Rajalingam gets enraged and sends goons to kill Selvam again. When he is cornered, Selvam is forced to take an aruval and defend himself, which gets filmed by the crowd. Veerapandi arrives to save Selvam, but Selvam gets arrested and remanded for 15 days as his action has reached the press.

Veerapandi swears to kill Rajalingam once he returns from the legislature meeting. After seeing Selvam's violence, Radhika decides not to disclose her love. Selvam is released and plans to kill off Rajalingam, who has become a PWD minister by using a political crisis and openly challenges to kill off Veerapandi in 30 days, as he does not need his support anymore. Selvam challenges Rajalingam that either Rajalingam will die within 30 days or Selvam will publicly apologize to him. Radhika learns that Selvam helped her uncle by recovering the money invested in the disputed land. After much hesitation, Radhika propose to Selvam, who accepts. Radhika introduces herself to Selvam's parents. Meanwhile, Rajalingam plans to kill Veerapandi, knowing about his train journey based on information from an anonymous caller.

However, Selvam arrives to the rescue and attacks the goons. Meanwhile, the truck sent to hit Veerapandi's car kills an innocent family, whose deaths causes Veerapandi to tell Rajalingam that the family's death will never leave unpunished. Later, Veerapandi realizes that he drank poisoned coffee and is rushed to the hospital, where his life is saved. Selvam is shocked to know that Radhika poisoned the coffee and was the one who informed Rajalingam about Veerapandi's travel plans. Selvam rushes to Radhika's home, where her mother Padmavathi and grandfather tells that Veerapandi killed Radhika's father Manickavel years ago, and they were waiting for an opportunity to exact vengeance. Veerapandi arrives at Radhika's home, overhearing their conversation and reveals the truth that it was the ruling party's goons, who killed Manickavel and not him.

Radhika's family feels guilty about their actions. Selvam feels betrayed that Radhika cheated him, but Radhika's family apologizes to Veerapandi, where he and Thangam forgive Radhika's mistake and urge Selvam to accept Radhika, which he does. Rajalingam hires 50 men from Rameshwaram to kill both Veerapandi and Selvam. Selvam hatches a plan with other villagers to burn hayfields and make it look like the job is already done, and leaves to kill Rajalingam. Selvam gets men to distract Rajalingam's goons and kills them one by one. The burnt haystacks cause the Rameshwaram goons to think that the job is done, and they leave. Selvam then lures Rajalingam to a place where he kills him, and escapes to Kuala Lumpur. After 6 months, Selvam returns to Pandiapuram, where he happily reunites with Radhika and his family.

Cast

Production
It was announced in 2010 that Hari and Dhanush would collaborate. The title was said to be "Aruva", but Hari denied that he would never keep such a title, and instead the title was announced as "Venghai". Telugu cinematographer Vetri was appointed for cinematographer. The film started its shooting in November 2010 at Trichy and lasted until May 2011, took place in Karaikudi, Kutralam, and Munnar. The song sequences have been shot in Phuket Islands and Malaysia.

Venghai was Hari's first collaboration with Dhanush and his second film with Vijaya Productions after Thamirabharani. This was Dhanush's second collaboration with Vijaya Productions and Tamanna after Padikkathavan.

Soundtrack

The film's music was scored by Devi Sri Prasad.

Release
The satellite rights of the film were sold to Sun TV.

Critical reception
Venghai received generally mixed  reviews from critics, who particularly noticed the predictability of the plot, but commercially successful blockbuster. Rediff's Pavithra Srinivasan gave the film 2.5 out of 5, labelling it as "tedious" and "an overdose of rural action", further claiming that it was "so overlaid with unnecessary bloodshed, repetitive action and predictable plot twists, that after a point you lose interest". Behindwoods gave 2.5 out of 5 and deemed that Venghai was "another Hari film with his usual ingredients but sans his usual spirit and this film might work for people who seek action entertainers set in villages." Rohit Ramachandran of nowrunning.com rated it 1/5, calling it "cheap entertainment." IBN Live gave 2.5 of 5 citing that the film was "typical Hari style formula movie [...] Despite the predictable story, Hari has managed to make the script interesting to some extent [...] The major flaw is that the story and screenplay have nothing new. Everything happens in a predictable manner." KollyInsider gave the film 2 out of 5 stars, claimed it as a 'Masala Entertainer'. Another portal, Indiaglitz said "Venghai is an entertainer that is racy and pacy. At the same time, there is no denial that a section of the audience would grouse, alleging that the film has nothing new to offer. But they are not Hari's target..."

Box office
The film collected  worldwide on its opening weekend.

References

External links
 
 

2010s masala films
Films shot in Tiruchirappalli
Films scored by Devi Sri Prasad
Films directed by Hari (director)
Films set in Tiruchirappalli
Indian action films
2011 action films
2011 films
2010s Tamil-language films